SKA-Sverdlovsk is a professional bandy club from Yekaterinburg, Russia, established in 1935 as part of the Sports Club of the Army (SKA). SKA-Sverdlovsk has historically been a very successful club having won the European Cup in 1974 and the national championship several times.

Team picture:

Honours

Domestic
 Russian Champions:
 Winners (12): 1950, 1953, 1956, 1958, 1959, 1960, 1962, 1966, 1968, 1971, 1974, 1994

International
 European Cup:
 Winners (1): 1974

Notable players

Nikolay Durakov — Seven-time world champion bandy.

References

External links
 Official website 

Bandy clubs in Russia
Bandy clubs in the Soviet Union
Sport in Yekaterinburg
Bandy clubs established in 1935
1935 establishments in Russia